We Are the Ocean are  a four-piece English rock band from Loughton, Essex, consisting guitarist, vocalist Liam Cromby, bass guitarist Jack Spence, guitarist Alfie Scully and drummer Tom Whittaker. Vocalist Dan Brown left the band in 2012. They are signed to Hassle Records in the United Kingdom and SideOneDummy Records in the United States.

Over the course of their career they have released four albums: Cutting Our Teeth in 2010, Go Now and Live in 2011, Maybe Today, Maybe Tomorrow in 2012, and Ark in 2015.

History

Formation and self-titled debut EP (2007–2008)

Dan Brown and Jack Spence were formerly in a band named Dead But Still Dreaming, and when they disbanded they set about finding new members for a new band. They had formed a full line-up again by 2007 with Liam Cromby, Rickie Bloom and Tom Whittaker, and still under the original name of Dead But Still Dreaming. After a while, Bloom left the band and was eventually replaced by Alfie Scully. Shortly after the creation of this solid line-up, the band decided on a new start with the name We Are the Ocean.

The band quickly shot to prominence thanks mainly to MySpace and were nominated for Kerrang! Best British Newcomer and voted K! Readers Poll 2nd best unsigned UK band. They released their debut EP entitled We Are the Ocean in 2008, selling 1000 limited edition copies in 1 day.

Cutting Our Teeth and subsequent touring (2008–2010)
We Are the Ocean have an extensive tour history, having toured all over the UK, Europe, the US and Australia. They have played countless festivals, including the main stage at Reading and Leeds Festival, Download Festival, and are one of few UK bands invited to play Bamboozle festival in New Jersey, USA, one of the largest alternative/punk festivals in the world.

We Are the Ocean started writing material for their debut album around December 2008. The album was produced by Brian McTernan (Thrice, The Bled, Converge) at Salad Days Studio in Baltimore, USA. They were originally aiming for a Summer 2009 release but for unknown reasons the album release date was delayed many times. Pushing back to November, then pushed back again to 25 January 2010, and finally pushed back to 1 February 2010.

The band re-released Cutting Our Teeth in October 2010 as a deluxe edition with a second disc, featuring the highly sought limited edition EP, and four unheard tracks. The re-release has received positive feedback from critics.

Departure of Dan Brown and Maybe Today, Maybe Tomorrow (2011–2013)
We Are the Ocean recorded their second album, titled Go Now and Live, with Pete Miles (The King Blues, Canterbury). The album's singles "What It Feels Like", "The Waiting Room" and "Runaway" were all playlisted on Radio 1, and received heavy rotation on many radio and television stations. The album reached number 45 in the chart in its first week.

On 1 March 2012, We Are the Ocean released that they will be entering the studio in May to record their third full-length album. On 5 June 2012, it was announced on their Facebook page that the band had parted ways with frontman Dan Brown, who would instead be pursuing a career as a band manager. Cromby will now be the primary vocalist. 

Their third studio album Maybe today, Maybe Tomorrow was released in the UK on 17 September 2012.

On 30 March 2013 We Are the Ocean performed at Radstock Festival.

Ark and disbandment (2014–2017)
With new management now on board, the band recorded their fourth album, titled ARK, in the summer of 2014 and released an eponymous teaser single at the end of the year. They recorded a BBC Live Lounge session, playing an acoustic version of the track and a cover of London Grammar's 'Hey Now' which led to BMG/Infectious signing the band. ARK was released on 11 May 2015.

After embarking on and finishing a tour to support their new album, updates on future endeavours became rare. In early 2016, the band was dropped by their label for undisclosed reasons. Later that year, they asked for pictures from past concerts on Facebook. On 18 January 2017, We Are the Ocean announced their disbandment and a farewell tour through Europe in February and March.

Reunion (2022)

On July 15, 2022, the band issued a statement on Facebook about their reunion. They announced their first live show in five years, on October 15 in London's Omeara Venue. The band have not confirmed if they will release new music in addition to this.

Band members
Current members
 Liam Cromby – lead vocals, rhythm guitar, piano (2007–2017, 2022)
 Alfie Scully – lead guitar (2007–2017, 2022); vocals (2012–2017, 2022)
 Jack Spence – bass guitar, backing vocals (2007–2017, 2022)
 Tom Whittaker – drums, percussion (2007–2017, 2022)

Former members
 Dan Brown – lead vocals (2007–2012)

Timeline

Discography

Studio albums

Extended plays

Singles

Music videos
 "Save Me! Said the Saviour" (2007)
 "Nothing Good Has Happened Yet" (2008)
 "Welcome to My Broken Home"
 "Look Alive" (2009)
 "All of This Has to End" (2010)
 "These Days I Have Nothing" (2010) 
 "Lucky Ones" (2010)
 "Waiting Room" (2011)
 "Runaway" (2011)
 "What It Feels Like" (2011)
 "Overtime Is a Crime" (2011)
 "The Road" (2012)
 "Young Heart" (2012)
 "Machine" (17 April 2013)
 "Chin Up, Son" (5 September 2013)
 "Holy Fire" (2015)
 "Do It Together" (2015)
 "Good For You" (2015)
 "Hey Now" (2015)
 "The Pretender (Foo Fighters cover)" (2015)

References

British post-hardcore musical groups
Hassle Records artists
Musical groups established in 2007
Musical groups disestablished in 2017